Graham Farquharson  (1940–2022) was a Canadian mining engineer and executive who was inducted into the Canadian Mining Hall of Fame in 2011 and the Order of Canada in 2021. He is known for his work in the development of underground mining methods and his leadership in the mining industry.

Career 
Farquharson began his career as a mining engineer, working in underground mines in Canada and South Africa. He then joined Inco Limited (now Vale), one of the largest mining companies in Canada, where he held various positions, including Vice President of Underground Mining, and was responsible for the design and construction of several underground mines.

Farquharson was a leader in the development of mechanized underground mining methods, and is credited with the successful implementation of Inco's "room-and-pillar" mining method, which greatly increased the efficiency and safety of underground mining operations. Under his leadership, Inco's Copper Cliff Deep Mine became one of the world's most productive underground mines.

In addition to his technical expertise, Farquharson was also known for his leadership and mentorship in the mining industry. He was a director of the Mining Industry Human Resources Council, and was actively involved in promoting education and training in the mining industry.

Farquharson was inducted into the Canadian Mining Hall of Fame in 2011 in recognition of his contributions to the mining industry. The Canadian Mining Hall of Fame recognizes individuals who have made outstanding contributions to the mining industry in Canada, and induction is considered one of the highest honors in the Canadian mining community.

Farquharson’s contributions continue to be of great significance to the mining industry in Canada. His work and leadership had a great influence on mining companies, mining engineers and mining industry professionals.

Philanthropy  
In addition to his accomplishments in the mining industry, Graham Farquharson is also known for his philanthropy. He has been actively involved in supporting education and community development, and has donated significant time and resources to a variety of charitable causes.

One of Farquharson's major philanthropic efforts has been his support of education. He has been involved with a number of educational institutions, and has served on the boards of several universities and colleges. He has also been a major donor to educational institutions and scholarship funds, with a particular focus on supporting students pursuing careers in the mining industry.

Farquharson has also been actively involved in supporting community development, particularly in Northern Ontario. He has been a strong advocate for the development of sustainable communities in the region and has provided financial support and leadership to a number of community development projects.

His contributions to community development have also been recognized by various organizations. He received the Paul Harris Fellow Award from Rotary International, in recognition of his philanthropic efforts. He has also been honored by the Ontario government with a prestigious Northern Ontario Heritage Award for his contributions to economic development in the region.

Farquharson’s philanthropic work shows a deep understanding of the importance of education and the role it plays in the sustainable development of communities. His contributions have had a positive impact on education and community development in Canada and his legacy continues to be felt through the work of the organizations and initiatives he supported.

References 

1940 births
2022 deaths
Members of the Order of Canada
Mining engineers
21st-century Canadian engineers
Engineers from Ontario
Canadian mining businesspeople